John Kidd (27 August 1884 – 1927) was a Scottish professional footballer who played as an inside forward. He scored 8 goals in 40 appearances in the Second Division of the Football League playing for Birmingham.

Kidd was born in Glasgow, and played for Third Lanark (winning the Scottish Cup in 1905) and St Johnstone, as well as in the English Southern League for Swindon Town between 1906 and 1908, before returning to England to join Birmingham in November 1910. He went straight into the first team and played regularly until January 1912, making 44 appearances in all competitions. He then played for Brierley Hill Alliance in the Birmingham & District League. After retiring from professional football Kidd kept pubs in the Brierley Hill area. He died in 1927 at the age of 42.

Notes

References

1884 births
1927 deaths
Footballers from Glasgow
Scottish footballers
Association football forwards
Maryhill F.C. players
Third Lanark A.C. players
Ayr Parkhouse F.C. players
Swindon Town F.C. players
St Johnstone F.C. players
Birmingham City F.C. players
Brierley Hill Alliance F.C. players
Scottish Football League players
Scottish Junior Football Association players
Southern Football League players
English Football League players